The 1997 Vuelta a España was the 52nd edition of the Vuelta a España, one of cycling's Grand Tours. The Vuelta began in Lisbon on 6 September, and Stage 12 occurred on 17 September with a stage from León. The race finished in Madrid on 27 September.

Stage 12

Stage 13

Stage 14
19 September 1997 — Oviedo to Alto del Naranco,

Stage 15
20 September 1997 — Oviedo to Lagos de Covadonga,

Stage 16
21 September 1997 — Cangas de Onís to Santander,

Stage 17
22 September 1997 — Santander to Burgos,

Stage 18
23 September 1997 — Burgos to Valladolid,

Stage 19

Stage 20
25 September 1997 —  to Ávila,

Stage 21
26 September 1997 — Alcobendas to Alcobendas,  (ITT)

Stage 22
27 September 1997 — Madrid to Madrid,

References

1997 Vuelta a España
Vuelta a España stages